The , commonly called the Pauly–Wissowa or simply RE, or PW, is a German encyclopedia of classical scholarship. With its supplements, it comprises over eighty volumes.

The RE is a complete revision of an older series, of which the first volume was published by August Pauly in 1839. Pauly died in 1845, his work unfinished; Christian Waltz and Wilhelm Siegmund Teuffel completed it in 1852. This first edition comprised six volumes. A second edition of the first volume was worked on from 1861 to 1866.

In 1890 Georg Wissowa started on the new and more ambitious edition. He expected it to be done in 10 years, but the last of its 83 volumes did not appear until 1978, and the index volume came out in 1980.

Each article was written by a recognized specialist in the relevant field, but unsurprisingly for a work spanning three generations, the underlying assumptions vary radically with the age of the article. Many early biographies for instance were written by Elimar Klebs, Paul von Rohden, Friedrich Münzer and Otto Seeck.

List of volumes

,  and Brill's New Pauly 
The price and size of Pauly–Wissowa have always been daunting, and so between 1964 and 1975 the J. B. Metzler'sche Verlagsbuchhandlung put out  in five volumes.

An updated version called , consisting of 18 volumes (although only 15 volumes were planned) and an index, appeared gradually from 1996 to 2003. Between 2004 and 2012 seven supplement volumes appeared.

An English edition, Brill's New Pauly: Encyclopaedia of the Ancient World, was published between 2002 and 2014 in 28 volumes (15 volumes in the main series on "Antiquity"; 5 volumes in the secondary series on "Classical Tradition"; an index volume for each of these series; and 6 Supplements).

The index to Pauly–Wissowa is available on CD-ROM.

See also
 Apopudobalia
 A Dictionary of Greek and Roman Antiquities

Bibliography
 August Pauly, Georg Wissowa, Wilhelm Kroll, Kurt Witte, Karl Mittelhaus, Konrat Ziegler, eds. , Stuttgart: J. B. Metzler, 1894–1980.
 Hubert Cancik, Helmuth Schneider, eds., Der neue Pauly. Enzyklopädie der Antike. Das klassische Altertum und seine Rezeptionsgeschichte, Stuttgart: J.B. Metzler, 2003, 11,611 pages. .
 Hubert Cancik, Helmuth Schneider, Manfred Landfester, Christine F. Salazar, eds. Brill's New Pauly: Encyclopaedia of the Ancient World, Brill Publishers, 2006. .

References

External links

 RE at German Wikisource
 J.B. Metzler Verlag: info about 
 Internet Archive: many of the earlier volumes can be found online here
 Volumes of the old Pauly
English translations of some RE articles

19th-century encyclopedias
20th-century encyclopedias
Encyclopedias of history
German encyclopedias
German-language encyclopedias